Battle of Agusan Hill, May 14, 1900.  Capt. Walter B. Elliott, CO of Company I, 40th Infantry Regiment USV,  with 80 men proceeded to the village of Agusan, about 16 kilometers west of Cagayan de Misamis town proper, to dislodge about 500 guerillas who were entrenched on a hill with 200 rifles and shotguns. The attack was successful; 2 Americans were killed and 3 wounded; the Filipinos suffered 38 killed, including their commander, Capt. Vicente Roa. The Americans also captured 35 Remington rifles

See also
Philippine–American War
Battle of Cagayan de Misamis
Battle of Makahambus Hill
Cagayan de Oro

Conflicts in 1900
1900 in the Philippines
Battles involving the United States
Battles of the Philippine–American War
History of Misamis Oriental
May 1900 events